Joshua David Hurwit (born in 1981) is an American lawyer who is serving as United States attorney for the District of Idaho since 2022.

Education 
Hurwit earned a Bachelor of Arts degree from Stanford University in 2002 and a Juris Doctor from Harvard Law School in 2006.

Career 
In 2006 and 2007, Hurwit worked as an associate at Paul, Weiss, Rifkind, Wharton & Garrison in New York City. In 2007 and 2008, he served as a law clerk for Judge Naomi Reice Buchwald of the United States District Court for the Southern District of New York. From 2008 to 2011, he was an associate at Kirkland & Ellis. He also worked as an associate at Covington & Burling in Washington, D.C. From 2012 to 2022, he served as an assistant United States attorney for the District of Idaho. During his tenure, Hurwit has prosecuted members of the Aryan Knights, a white supremacist gang active in Idaho. He has also served as the District of Idaho's coronavirus fraud coordinator.

U.S. attorney for the District of Idaho 
On April 22, 2022, President Joe Biden announced his intent to nominate Hurwit to serve as the United States attorney for the District of Idaho. On April 25, 2022, his nomination was sent to the Senate. On June 9, 2022, his nomination was reported out of the Senate Judiciary Committee by a voice vote; senators Josh Hawley and Marsha Blackburn were recorded as "Nay". On June 13, 2022, his nomination was confirmed in the United States Senate by voice vote. He was sworn in by Chief Judge David Nye on June 17, 2022.

References

External links 
 

Living people
21st-century American lawyers
Assistant United States Attorneys
Harvard Law School alumni
Idaho lawyers
People associated with Kirkland & Ellis
Stanford University alumni
United States Attorneys for the District of Idaho
1981 births